SBSD or S.B.S.D. may refer to:

Santa Barbara Unified School District
San Bernardino County Sheriff's Department
Security-based swap dealer